Florida's 11th congressional district is a congressional district in the U.S. state of Florida. It includes Sumter County, home to The Villages, and parts of Lake, Orange, and Polk counties. In the 2020 redistricting cycle, the district was moved out of its coastal counties and into Orlando's western suburbs.

From 1993 to 2013, the former 11th district had encompassed most of the city of Tampa and its suburbs and the shoreline of southeastern Hillsborough County. It also included two areas in other counties: urban neighborhoods of south St. Petersburg in Pinellas County and neighborhoods in and around Bradenton in Manatee County. Most of that district is now the 14th district, while the current 11th is the successor of the old 5th district.

From 2013 to 2017 as well as its next iteration from 2017 to 2023, the district included Sumter County, Citrus County, Hernando and central Marion County, as well as northern Lake County. It also included southern Ocala, Bushnell, and Spring Hill. The Villages, a large retirement and golfing community for seniors, is situated in this district, aiding Republican candidates in the district and statewide.

Since the redistricting for the 2022 elections, the district includes Bay Lake, home to all four theme parks of Walt Disney World.

The district is currently represented by Republican Daniel Webster.

List of members representing the district

Presidential voting since 2000
Election results from presidential races:

Election results

2002

2004

2006

2008

2010

2016

2018

2020

2022

Historical district boundaries

Over 3 decades earlier, from 1983 to 1993, the district was based in Brevard County, including the Kennedy Space Center. In 1986, weeks before the Challenger disaster, the district's then-congressman, Bill Nelson, (who later served as U.S. Senator from Florida from 2001 to 2019, and has been NASA Administrator since 2021) flew on board the Space Shuttle Columbia as part of mission STS-61-C.

From 1993 to 2013 the district was based in Tampa plus the shoreline of Tampa Bay; the city's long-serving congressman Sam Gibbons retired in 1997 after nearly 35 years in the House.

References

 
 
 Congressional Biographical Directory of the United States 1774–present

11
Government of Tampa, Florida